Filthy Rich is an American sitcom television series that aired on CBS from August 1982 to June 1983. Starring Dixie Carter and Charles Frank, the series satirized prime-time soap operas such as Dallas and Dynasty.

Premise
The series was set in Memphis at a fictional mansion called Toad Hall, which was owned by one Big Guy Beck (Slim Pickens in the pilot, and Forrest Tucker afterwards), a very wealthy land baron. He had recently died of an undisclosed illness, and before he was cryonically frozen, he had made out a videotaped will, a piece of which was played every week, by his lawyer, George Wilhoit (David Healy and Vernon Weddle).

The will's terms were harshest on Big Guy's oldest son, the snobbish Marshall Beck (Michael Lombard) and his equally snobbish wife Carlotta (Dixie Carter). Also aghast at the will's terms was Big Guy's wily younger wife, Kathleen (Delta Burke). The terms stated that the family wouldn't be able to collect a dime of their inheritance until they accepted Big Guy's illegitimate son, Wild Bill Westchester (Jerry Hardin) and his good-natured but ditzy wife Bootsie (Ann Wedgeworth) into their family.

Many of the situations stemmed from the conniving Carlotta, Mashall and Kathleen's schemes to declare the terms and constraints of the will invalid and also to rid themselves of Wild Bill and Bootsie, not to mention the rest of the family, out of their lives, so the snobs could live it up on the money they would receive. Their wildly outlandish schemes usually and inevitably ended up failing.

Also appearing were Nedra Volz, who played Big Guy's senile first wife, Winona Beck, called Mother B., who had escaped from her nursing home; and Charles Frank, who played Big Guy's younger son Stanley.

Stanley, independently wealthy because he invested his money wisely, and thus not concerned about his inheritance from his father, was the nicest of the whole lot. Usually, it was Stanley who was able to protect Wild Bill and Bootsie (whom he and Mother B. accepted outright) from the devious scheming of his stepmother, who lusted after him; and his conniving brother and sister in-law.

Cast and characters
Starring (in alphabetical order)
 Delta Burke as Kathleen Beck, Big Guy's much younger second wife. A very wily woman, she openly lusted after her younger stepson, Stanley, who often deflected her unwelcome advances. Despite siding with Marshall and Carlotta against the Westchesters, they regularly squabbled amongst themselves with Carlotta often calling her a "tramp" and "slut". She is also thoroughly disliked by Big Guy's previous wife, "Mother B", who derisively calls her "Big Girl".
 Dixie Carter as Carlotta Beck, Marshall's snobby and shrewish wife and Big Guy's daughter-in-law. She considers herself the only reigning queen of Toad Hall, and is always plotting with Marshall and Kathleen to get rid of the Westchesters (as well as Mother B and Stanley), so they would be the only ones with access to Big Guy's vast fortune. Despite this, the three would often argue among one another as much as they fought the Westchesters. Their schemes were often thwarted by their own ineptitude or by Stanley, who saw them for the connivers that they were. Although they shared the same goal, Carlotta couldn't stand Kathleen and vice versa. Carlotta would always snidely remind Kathleen that she was only Big Guy's second wife and thus, was only her stepmother-in-law.  She was also an enemy of Mother B, given that she and Marshall had put her in the nursing home, and she would often rat out her and Marshall and their wrongdoings, in retaliation.
 Charles Frank as Stanley Beck, Big Guy and Mother B's son and younger brother of Marshall. He is independently wealthy (due to some wise investments) and not in need of any inheritance. He is the most down-to-earth of the family and welcomed the Westchesters immediately. An avid Dr. Pepper drinker, Stanley is kind and concerned about others, but will not tolerate the more dishonest shenanigans of Marshall, Kathleen and Carlotta. He has a close bond with his mother, Mother B (who calls him Skippy) and is usually there to help his half-brother and half-sister in-law in dealing with the other Becks and thwarting their schemes.
 Jerry Hardin as Wild Bill Westchester, a used RV salesman and Big Guy's illegitimate son. He and Bootsie were almost scared out of the house by Marshall, Carlotta and Kathleen, by means of a phony seance, but was convinced by Stanley and Mother B, who truly cared about them, that they would always have a home at Toad Hall, whether the other Becks liked it or not.
 Michael Lombard as Marshall Beck, Big Guy and Mother B's oldest son. He is bisexual and in therapy for it, and is slightly weak willed compared to his wife, tending to wheeze a lot because of his asthma. Although he loves Carlotta, they often bicker. He is appalled that at the presence of the Westchesters in their home, and equally appalled that his younger brother and mother would welcome them with open arms. He is usually put in his place by his mother, who tended to know more about his dishonesty and often delighted in ratting him out.
 Nedra Volz as Winona "Mother B" Beck, Big Guy's first wife and the senile mother of Marshall and Stanley. She belied her age by constantly escaping her nursing home, eventually, escaping for good, and moving into Toad Hall. She, like her favored younger son, Stanley, whom she calls "Skippy", accepted the Westchesters outright and often take delight in ratting out Marshall and Carlotta in retaliation for them putting her in the nursing home.
 Ann Wedgeworth as Bootsie Westchester, Wild Bill's gentle natured but ditzy wife.  She, like Wild Bill, is thrilled to be part of the family. Her marriage was almost ruined by Kathleen, Marshall and Carlotta but she, along with Stanley's help, thwarted it. She unwaveringly loves Wild Bill, and makes the most of being on a budget.
Also starring
 Slim Pickens ( 1) & Forrest Tucker ( 2) as Big Guy Beck, a very wealthy land baron and the patriarch of Toad Hall. His will stipulated that his family accept his illegitimate son, Wild Bill Westchester and his wife Bootsie into the family. He was married to Kathleen when he died and is the father of Marshall and Stanley by his first wife "Mother B".  He has a tendency to end his videotapes with singing a very off-key version of "Happy Trails".
 David Healy ( 1) & Vernon Weddle ( 2) as George Wilhoit, Big Guy's lawyer who plays a section of his late client's video will every week, and was there to make sure the conditions, however outlandish, were carried out.  Some conditions were reasonable (like the family getting a job or living within a strict budget, after Marshall, Carlotta and Kathleen were caught trying to throw out the Westchesters) while others (where Big Guy had Stanley kidnapped on his birthday to find out who his true friends were) were more bizarre.

Production
Series creator Linda Bloodworth began her television career by co-writing a script for an episode of M*A*S*H with Mary Kay Place, and when that script was nominated for an Emmy Award, she found herself in high demand. Bloodworth was offered staff positions on several television series, but she turned them down. "I just wanted to get my own shows on the air", she said.  "I didn't want to die working those long hours for someone else's show. I didn't want to bleed unless it was for my own show."  She formed her own production company, produced numerous pilot episodes and then, in 1980, she got the idea for Filthy Rich.  "I just set out to write a comedy about Southerners — eccentric Southerners."

The hour-long pilot for Filthy Rich was filmed on February 27, 1981 as a candidate for inclusion on CBS's 1981–82 fall schedule.  When the fall schedule was announced in May, Filthy Rich wasn't included, but the network optioned it as a potential midseason replacement.  "Apparently, the network wasn't sure of its feelings", commented Dixie Carter.  "Some executives liked the concept, others despised it."  Meanwhile, Delta Burke was offered the role of Katherine Wentworth on Dallas, as well as a recurring role on the TV spin-off of Private Benjamin, but she was forced to turn both parts down because she was under contract for Filthy Rich.  Similarly, Carter was asked to replace Tammy Grimes in the Broadway production of 42nd Street, but CBS prevented her from accepting.  Instead, cast members were forced to take small roles in films and guest-star on various TV shows while awaiting word on the fate of Filthy Rich.

In March 1982, CBS ordered a second pilot episode, this time as a half-hour show.  The network stipulated that they wanted the new pilot to be "less bizarre" than the original pilot had been, and though the material was toned down a bit, they still passed on including the show on the fall schedule.

In that era, it wasn't unusual for unsold pilots to be broadcast as filler during the summer – replacing low-rated reruns – as a means of recouping the money that was spent to produce them.  The original hour-long pilot was split in two and re-edited, then packaged with the second pilot (titled "Town and Garden"), and the now-trio of episodes were  billed as a "limited run" series which was broadcast on Monday nights following reruns of M*A*S*H in August 1982.  Much to CBS's surprise, the show topped the weekly Nielsen ratings for three consecutive weeks.  CBS Entertainment President Donald "Bud" Grant later commented, "I think we conned ourselves into thinking Filthy Rich was a hot show."  The network scrambled to find a place on the fall schedule for the show, ultimately opting to bump the new series Mama Malone off the schedule altogether (Mama Malone eventually aired in 1984).

Although viewers initially tuned in, the series fared poorly with critics.  "This is the most misunderstood show I've ever been associated with", said Bloodworth.  Associated Press writer Fred Rothenberg commented in his widely circulated review, "It's called Filthy Rich and the slant is more toward the former than the latter."  Bloodworth retaliated, "I think because the Southern accents are thick and the first shows were very theatrical and broad, the critics tuned out."  She went on to defend the show against the Southern critics who'd bashed the series as well. "There are a lot of liberal-minded critics who consider themselves the keepers of the Southern flame. We're not maligning the South, we're celebrating it."

While working on the show, Burke felt particularly pressured to maintain a slender figure.  "That's when I discovered crystal meth, a powerful amphetamine that cut my hunger but made my heart race", she revealed in her autobiography.  It had the side effect of paranoia and making her lapse into unconsciousness.

Adding further woes to the troubled series, actor Slim Pickens, who played Big Guy Beck in the original hour-long pilot episode, was rushed to San Francisco Medical Center several days before the series premiered, and he underwent five hours of surgery to remove a brain tumor the day after the show's TV debut.  Pickens was released from the hospital before production resumed on the series, but he was unfit to appear.  Most subsequent episodes played without Big Guy, though Pickens was quickly replaced by Forrest Tucker, who didn't play the role with the same broad, comic zeal.

Production soldiered on a little behind schedule.  In the early weeks of September, scripts hadn't been completed for any episodes of the fall season, which began on September 26.  "Every night I go home with notes on all the network suggestions and work on the scripts", Bloodworth said. "A messenger comes to pick up my rewrites at 1 a.m. I write in longhand and the scripts are typed and returned at 7 a.m. I'm sure my neighbors think I'm in some illegal business."  Bloodworth quickly churned out some scripts, but she hired former Jimmy Carter speech writer E. Jack Kaplan to help pick up the slack.

Filthy Rich returned to the air on Wednesday, October 5.  Nestled between Alice and Tucker's Witch and opposite the new series NBC's Family Ties, ratings quickly plummeted; Filthy Rich ranked #60 in the weekly TV ratings by the end of October.  In November, six weeks into the show's second season, all three series were yanked off the schedule and replaced with The CBS Wednesday Movie.  Filthy Rich returned to the schedule by January 1983 — on Monday nights, sandwiched between Square Pegs and M*A*S*H.  Ratings didn't improve.  It aired for a month before being pulled from the schedule again.  The remaining two episodes aired in June, after the series had officially been canceled.

Designing Women and Evening Shade
Filthy Rich paved the way for one of CBS's most successful TV series of the late 1980s: Designing Women.  "I'd worked with Dixie and Delta on Filthy Rich", Bloodworth revealed in a 1986 interview.  "We've had a secret plot since then to work together again."  Bloodworth created the roles of Julia and Suzanne Sugarbaker for Carter and Burke (Burke referred to her Filthy Rich character as "Suzanne in the Beginning;" and Carter's Julia, with her self-righteous, long-winded monologues had more than a bit in common with Carlotta) and numerous one-liners were recycled along with a "hog hat" prop which was prominently featured in episodes of both series.  Filthy Rich stars Nedra Volz and Charles Frank each guest-starred on Designing Women, as did guest-stars Tracey Walter, William Utay, Davis Roberts and John Petlock, and E. Jack Kaplan penned an early episode.  Additionally, Charles Frank reunited with Burke for an episode of the short-lived Designing Women spin-off Women of the House.

By the early 1990s, another Filthy Rich cast member found work in a new Bloodworth series. Evening Shade, which aired from 1990 through 1994, included Ann Wedgeworth among its cast as Merleen Eldridge, the wife of the town doctor.

Episodes

Season 1 (1982)

Season 2 (1982–83)

Ratings

References

External links 
 

1982 American television series debuts
1983 American television series endings
1980s American satirical television series
1980s American sitcoms
CBS original programming
English-language television shows
Television series created by Linda Bloodworth-Thomason
Television series by Sony Pictures Television
Television shows set in Tennessee